FC Rostov is a Russian professional football club based in Rostov-on-Don, Rostov Oblast. The club are members of the Russian Premier League, and play at the Rostov Arena. After the 2022 Russian invasion of Ukraine, the European Club Association suspended the team.

History

1930-1989
The club was established on 10 May 1930, and was initially named Selmashstroy (Сельмашстрой). They were renamed Selmash in 1936 and Traktor in 1941. In 1950, the club joined the South Zone of the Azov-Don group of the Russian SFSR Championship. The following season they were placed in Group B of the championship. After finishing first in their group, they played in Group A in 1952. A third-place finish meant the club were promoted to the Class B for the 1953 season, during which they were renamed again, becoming Torpedo. In 1958, they were renamed Rostselmash.

In 1964 the club won their Division of Class B. In the Russian-zone play-offs they finished second in the first round and top in the second after defeating Terek Grozny 2–0 in the deciding match, earning promotion to the Soviet First League. The following season they finished bottom of the division, but were not relegated as the number of teams in the division was increased.

By the early 1970s the club was back in the Russian leagues. In 1975 they returned to Class B (now known as the Soviet Second League). Following several near misses, the club won their zone of the Second League in 1985. They went on to win a play-off tournament, earning promotion back to the First League.

1990-2019
In 1991 the club finished fourth in what was the final season of Soviet football following the USSR's disintegration. This was enough to earn them a place in the new Russian Top League. Following an eighth-place finish in their first season, the 1993 season saw the club struggle, eventually finishing second bottom, resulting in relegation to the First League.

The club made an immediate return to the Top League after finishing second in the 1994 First League season. In 2003, they adopted their current name and reached the Russian Cup final for the first time, losing 1–0 to Spartak Moscow. In 2007 they finished bottom of the (now renamed) Premier Division and were relegated to the First Division. However, they made another return to the top division as First Division champions.

Rostov won the 2013–14 Russian Cup, defeating FC Krasnodar on penalties 6–5, and earned qualification to the 2014–15 UEFA Europa League. However Rostov were excluded from the competition at the end of May 2014, due to breached financial rules, being replaced by Spartak Moscow. Later Rostov appealed the decision of the local football federation to lift the club from the tournament in the Court of Arbitration for Sport in Lausanne, the club won the right to play.

On 18 December 2014, the official website of FC Rostov announced the appointment of Kurban Berdyev as head coach. Under his leadership, the team has maintained a place in the Premier League on aggregate (1–0, 4–1) beating "Tosno" in the play-offs Premier League – First Division.  Throughout the second half of 2015, the club had problems with the payment of salaries and bonuses the players, but it has not prevented the club at the end of the first part of the season 2015–16 to hold 2nd place in the championship.

In the 2016–17 season, Rostov earned a UEFA Champions League spot in the League Route as runners-up of the Russian Premier League. In the third qualifying round, they were drawn against Anderlecht. After a 2–2 home draw, they beat Anderlecht 2–0 away. In the play-off, Rostov were drawn against Dutch giants Ajax. In the first leg in Amsterdam, Netherlands, they held on to a 1–1 draw, which gave them an away goal advantage. In the return leg, Rostov earned a 4–1 surprise win over Ajax and qualified for the UEFA Champions League group stages, a stunning performance as was their first qualification into the group stages of a European tournament. Rostov were drawn in Group D, against Bayern Munich, Atlético Madrid and PSV Eindhoven, gaining their first Champions League victory on 23 November 2016, defeating Bayern Munich 3–2 at Olimp-2.

On 9 June 2017, Rostov announced Leonid Kuchuk as their new manager on a one-year contract with the option of an additional year. Kuchuk resigned and was replaced by Valeri Karpin during the winter break in December 2017.

2020-present
On 19 June 2020, Rostov were due to play their first match of the restarted Russian Premier League season, which had been suspended due to the COVID-19 pandemic, against PFC Sochi. Rostov were in fourth place, just a few points of UEFA Champions League qualification. A few days before the match, six players in Rostov's first-team squad tested positive for the coronavirus, putting the entire first-team squad into a 14-day quarantine period. This forced the club to select their Under-18 squad to play the match, making it the youngest starting 11 and the youngest matchday squad in Russian Premier League history. Rostov would go on to lose 10–1, but the youngsters were highly praised for their performance with 17-year-old goalkeeper Denis Popov named man-of-the-match after saving a penalty and making 15 saves, a Russian Premier League record, and 17-year-old Roman Romanov scoring his first senior goal on his debut in the first minute of the match.

On 26 October 2021, Rostov announced Turkmenistani coach Vitaly Kafanov as their new manager.

After the 2022 Russian invasion of Ukraine, the European Club Association suspended the team.

Seasons

Domestic

European

Notes
 3Q: Third qualifying round
 2R: Second round
 3R: Third round
 PO: Play-off round
 SF: Semi–finals

Honours

Domestic competitions
Russian Premier League
 Runners-up (1): 2015–16

Russian Cup
 Winners (1): 2013–14

Russian Super Cup
 Runners-up (1): 2014

Russian National Football League
 Winners (1): 2008

Players

, according to the Official Russian Premier League website.

Other players under contract

Out on loan

Coaching staff
{|class="wikitable"
|-
!Position
!Staff
|-
|Manager|||  Vitaliy Kafanov
|-
|Senior coach|||  Valery Karpin
|-
|Assistant coach||| Mikhail Osinov
|-
|Fitness coach|| Luís Casais Martínez
|-
|Analyst-coach|| Jonatan Alba Cabello
|-
|Rehabilitation coach|| Hugo Ogando Berea
|-
|Rehabilitation coach|| Álvaro Sayabera Iñarrea
|-
|Rehabilitation coach|| Fernando Rodriguez López
|-
|Head physiotherapist|| Guillermo Aladrén Pérez
|-
|Physiotherapist-rehabilitator|| Raúl Álvarez Canle
|-
|Medic|| Vladimir Shulyak
|-
|Masseur|| Artyom Kozyrev

FC Rostselmash-2 Rostov-on-Don 
Rostov's reserve squad played professionally as FC Rostselmash-d Rostov-on-Don (Russian Second League in 1992–93, Russian Third League in 1996–97) and FC Rostselmash-2 Rostov-on-Don (Russian Second Division in 1998–2000).

References

External links

 

 
Association football clubs established in 1930
Rostov
Rostov
1930 establishments in Russia